Stanley Wilson Seltzer (November 8, 1927 – August 1, 2000) was an American jazz pianist.

Seltzer was the pianist in the house band at Ricky's Lounge in Alhambra with Paul Peters and Carl Frederick Tandberg.

References

1927 births
2000 deaths
American jazz pianists
American male pianists
20th-century American male musicians
American male jazz musicians
20th-century American pianists